Orangeville High School , now referred to as Orangeville CUSD (Community Unit School District #203), is a public School four year high school that also hosts the Junior High and the elementary school level grades for the entire school district. The building is located at 201 S. Orange St in Orangeville, Illinois, a village in Stephenson County, Illinois. The school serves students residing in the communities of Orangeville, Red Oak, Oneco, Afolkey, Buena Vista, Damascus, Buckhorn Corners, and surrounding area.  In 2019, the city’s elementary school was transferred to this building to include all grades within the same complex.  The building itself was built to its current state in 1948 after the original building (built in 1884) was destroyed by a fire.

Orangeville Illinois Community Unit School District

The Orangeville school system is its own Illinois School District. Since all grades are now located in the same building, instead of the school being referred to as “Orangeville High School” or “Middle School” or “Elementary School”, it is collectively referred to as Orangeville Illinois CUSD (Community Unit School District) #203 (OCUSD203). OCUSD203 is a public school system located in Orangeville, Illinois at 201 S Orange St.  It combines the previous Elementary School into the existing Orangeville High School which already housed the Middle School.  This change occurred in 2019. The old elementary school was located at 310 S East St.  OCUSD203 has Pre-K programming as well as primary school and secondary school level education classes.  In addition to traditional classes, OCUSD offers electives in agriculture, business, music, and Spanish.  Juniors & Seniors also have an opportunity to take classes through “CareerTec”. OCUSD203 employs 53 staff members.  OCUSD203 offers daily lunches. OCUSD203 in 2021 had 325 students listed. OCUSD203 has a student body consisting of 4% students of color (majority Hispanic), which is much lower than the Illinois public school average of 52% students of color.

OCUSD offers many athletic opportunities, including speech, and several sports teams, including ice hockey, baseball, softball, and high school and junior high football and volleyball, as well as high school and junior high  boys' and girls' basketball. Their team is the Broncos. Their colors are purple and gold.

The OCUSD203 district boundaries include all of Stephenson County, Illinois. Nearby school districts include: Lena-Winslow, Illinois, Freeport, Illinois, Dakota, Illinois, and Durand, Illinois.

Academics
Based on the Illinois School Report Card for the 2018-19 school year, Orangeville had a graduation rate of 96%. Additionally, in 2019, Orangeville ranked as the 10,947th best school in the United States, 332nd in Illinois, and 2nd in the Freeport metro area based on U.S. News & World Report.

Athletics
The Broncos compete in the Northwest Upstate Illini Conference.  They participate in several IHSA sponsored athletics and activities, including; football, girls volleyball, boys & girls basketball, baseball, softball, and music. Additionally, they Co-Op with Dakota for wrestling, Monroe High School, (Monroe, Wisconsin)
for Ice Hockey, and Lena-Winslow High School for Competitive Speech

Teams

The following teams finished in the top four of their respective IHSA sponsored state championship tournaments:

Football:   1A State Champions (1989–90)
Girls Softball:   1A Third Place
Music Sweepstakes:   Class D State Champions (2003–04) 2nd Place (2004–05) Class D State Champions (2005–06) Class D State Champions (2006–07) Class D State Champions (2007–08) Class D State Champions (2008–09)

Individual

The following athletes finished the season as state champion:

*Orangeville students; Kuehl, Schurch and Wessels were running for Lena-Winslow High School during their co-operative season.

Activities
Activities at Orangeville High School include Student Council, Servant Leadership, Choir, Band, Theater Department, Spanish, National Honor Society, FFA, CareerTec, and Yearbook.
Bass Fishing and Academic Bowl have also been offered.

Notes & References

Public high schools in Illinois
Schools in Stephenson County, Illinois